The Immediate Geographic Region of Ponte Nova is one of the 10 immediate geographic regions in the Intermediate Geographic Region of Juiz de Fora, one of the 70 immediate geographic regions in the Brazilian state of Minas Gerais and one of the 509 of Brazil, created by the National Institute of Geography and Statistics (IBGE) in 2017.

Municipalities 
It comprises 19 municipalities.

 Acaiaca     
 Alvinópolis    
 Amparo da Serra  
 Barra Longa
 Diogo de Vasconcelos    
 Dom Silvério 
 Guaraciaba 
 Jequeri   
 Oratórios  
 Piedade de Ponte Nova   
 Ponte Nova  
 Rio Casca 
 Rio Doce  
 Santa Cruz do Escalvado   
 Santo Antônio do Grama 
 São Pedro dos Ferros 
 Sem-Peixe  
 Sericita 
 Urucânia

References 

Geography of Minas Gerais